Moseley is a surname. Notable people with the surname include:

Bill Moseley (born 1951), American actor
C. C. Moseley (1894–1974), American aviator, trainer and businessman
Doug Moseley (1928–2017), United Methodist clergyman and member of the Kentucky State Senate
Dustin Moseley (born 1981), Major League Baseball pitcher
Edwin Lincoln Moseley (1865–1948), American naturalist
Emmanuel Moseley (born 1996), American football player
Ezra Moseley (born 1958), West Indian cricketer
Frank Moseley (1911–1979), American college sports coach and administrator
George Van Horn Moseley (1874–1960), United States Army general
Henry Moseley (1887–1915), English physicist
Henry J. Moseley (c. 1819 – 1894) builder and hotelier in Glenelg, South Australia
Henry Nottidge Moseley (1844–1891), British naturalist
Humphrey Moseley (died 1661), London bookseller and publisher
Increase Moseley (1712–1795), American government official
James Moseley (politician) (c. 1847 – 1937), politician in South Australia
James W. Moseley (born 1931), American ufologist
Jonny Moseley (born 1975), Puerto Rican skier and 1998 Olympic gold medalist
John O. Moseley (1893–1955), American academic and university president
Keith Moseley (born 1965), American musician
Macauley Moseley (born 1997), British Law Scholar
Marisa Moseley (born 1982), American basketball coach
Mark Moseley (born 1948), retired National Football League placekicker
Michael E. Moseley, American anthropologist
Moses J. Moseley (1990-2022), American actor
Semie Moseley (1935–1992), American guitar designer and founder of the Mosrite guitar manufacturing corporation
T. Michael Moseley (born 1949), former Chief of Staff of the United States Air Force
Vickie M. Moseley (born 1956), American politician
William Moseley (actor) (born 1987), English actor
William Dunn Moseley (1795–1863), American politician from North Carolina
William P. Moseley (1819-1890) businessman and Virginia senator
Winston Moseley, convicted in the 1964 murder of Kitty Genovese

See also
Mosely, surname
Mosley (surname)

English toponymic surnames